Río Verde (Spanish for "green river") is a river in central Mexico. It is a tributary of the Río Grande de Santiago. Its basin is mostly in the state of Jalisco, and extends into portions of Aguascalientes, Zacatecas, Guanajuato, and San Luis Potosí.

Proposed dams
Two dams are proposed on the Río Verde. El Purgatorio reservoir is proposed on the lower river, near its confluence with the Rio Grande de Santiago. It is intended to supply drinking water to the Guadalajara Metropolitan Area. Construction of the dam began in 2011. The Jalisco communities of Temacapulín, Palmarejo, and Acasico, which would be permanently flooded by the reservoir, have opposed the project, and succeeded in delaying its completion with lawsuits. As of August 2021 the dam is not completed and work had not resumed.

The El Zapotillo dam site is further upstream on the Río Verde. It is intended to produce water for Guadalajara and for León, which lies immediately southeast of the Río Verde basin. Work on El Zapotillo dam was also suspended, and as of August 2021 had not resumed.

See also
List of rivers of Mexico

References

Atlas of Mexico, 1975 (http://www.lib.utexas.edu/maps/atlas_mexico/river_basins.jpg).
The Prentice Hall American World Atlas, 1984.
Rand McNally, The New International Atlas, 1993.

Rivers of Jalisco
Río Grande de Santiago
Rivers of the Sierra Madre Occidental